The San Isidoro y San Leandro Western Orthodox Catholic Church of the Hispanic Mozarabic Rite is a church in the Alphabet City area of the East Village neighborhood of Manhattan, New York City. It was consecrated in 1892.

History 

The structure began as a tenement house, acquired by the Roman Catholic Church of St. Elizabeth of Hungary in 1891 for $7,500. The new building was built by architect Edward Wenz for a fee of 16,200, and consecrated in 1892.

Over time, the neighborhood became more Russian and Ukrainian, and the German, Polish, and Hungarian population moved uptown. The congregation purchased and relocated to the St. Elizabeth of Hungary Church in the Upper East Side in 1917, and the building was sold to the Russian Greek Orthodox Church of the Holy Trinity sometime before 1930.

The building was sold again in 1975, to become the San Isidoro y San Leandro Western Orthodox Catholic Church of the Hispanic Mozarabic Rite.

In popular culture
The church appears on the cover of rapper Kool Moe Dee's 1987 album How Ya Like Me Now.

References

Further reading
 2021 "You can buy and live inside this church in the East Village for $5 million", 2021 article in Time Out

External links 
 Vintage photo
 Vintage street view

Roman Catholic churches in Manhattan
Roman Catholic churches completed in 1892
East Village, Manhattan
19th-century Roman Catholic church buildings in the United States